My Own Thing is the debut studio album by the Christian rapper Manafest.  It was independently released on December 2, 2003.

The release attracted the notice of Trevor McNevan of the Ontario-based rock band Thousand Foot Krutch and led shortly after to Manafest's signing with BEC Recordings under the Uprok Records label for his next album.

Later after its initial release, the 2005 track "Skills" (off Epiphany) was added as track 5 on the album.

Critical reception
The release only garnered a few glances from professional music sites and reviews.  They were however, generally positive.

Rapzilla praised the album saying "Manafest does an excellent job at sharing the message of Christ throughout My Own Thing, for peeps inside and outside of the four walls. This record is definitely worth adding to your collection. I wouldn’t doubt if you continue to hear strong efforts from Manafest in the future".  Cross Rhythms positively noted "Manafest (aka Chris Greenwood), brings an unusual and varied offering from the northern climes of Canada.... Overall, a strong album with a gritty East Coast edge and heavy rock grooves".  Finally, RationaL went on to state: "I get the feeling, after numerous listens, that  My Own Thing  had the makings of something special. Very little promotion or hype was put into this release, which is somewhat of a disappointment, when it is clear that Manafest is a talented artist with loads of potential. Nonetheless, the LP was a nice refreshment from the everyday hip-hop album, and, despite the lack of hype surrounding this release, you can expect big things from the Canadian kid in the very near future. My Own Thing is just a taste of things to come".

Track listing

Personnel
-Numbers in parenthesis symbolize track numbers
Manafest - lead vocals, executive producer
Jusachyl - additional vocals on track 11
Relic the Oddity (Mark Morley) - additional vocals on track 14, scratching (1, 6, 7, 9)
Aubrey "Bre" Noronha - vocals (track 13)
Charles "DJ Versatile" Sabota - scratching (2, 3, 9, 18, 19)
Trevor McNevan - additional vocals on bonus track 5
John Gillard - guitar (track 14 only)
Adam Messinger - mixing (select tracks)
Rob Berger - vocals (track 5), mixing (select tracks)
That Brotha Lokey (Gerhard Thomas) - producer
Melanie Greenwood - photography, graphic design

Music videos

Lyric videos

Notes
Track 4, 6, 7, 8, 17 & 19 off the album were re-released on Manafest's 2005 album Epiphany.
"Childs of Light" is an old song from Under One King, the hip-hop group started by Chris Greenwood and his fellow rapper Jusachyl before he became Manafest.
In 2004, Manafest released a My Own Thing vinyl EP which included the tracks "What I Got to Say", "Slang Talkin'", "Down Town", an alternate mix of "Down Town", and a few instrumental versions of the songs.  The EP was released under Frontline Records.

References

2003 debut albums
Manafest albums